Around the World in 80 Years is a Jazz album by Bucky Pizzarelli, released in 2006. The album features performances by his sons and daughter, and is a musical retrospective of his career.

Track listing
 The Tonight Show Theme1:40 
 When the Moon Comes Over the Mountain2:14
 Racing With the Moon3:44
 Lullaby of Broadway4:26
 Cry Me a River4:06
 Minute Samba1:57
 A Nightingale Sang in Berkley Square4:17 
 The End of a Love Affair1:54  
 Bucknees's Blues6:09  
 Nuages6:31  
 Body and Soul5:19  
 Twilight Time5:37  
 Seven Comes Eleven5:19

Personnel
Bucky Pizzarelliguitar, leader
John Pizzarelliguitar
Mary Pizzarelliguitar
Martin Pizzarellidouble bass
Tony Tedescodrums
Ray Kennedy- piano, producer

References

2006 albums
Bucky Pizzarelli albums
Swing albums